Double Bay is a harbourside eastern suburb of Sydney, in the state of New South Wales, Australia 4 kilometres east of the Sydney central business district. It is the administrative centre of the local government area of the Municipality of Woollahra.

Double Bay takes its name from the bay of Sydney Harbour and refers to the two geographical formations between Point Piper and Darling Point, which are interrupted by a miniature point in between. The eastern part is also known as Blackburn Cove. It has some of the most expensive real-estate in Australia and is colloquially often referred to as "Double Pay", a term coined due to the high income of people living there, and the nature of the shopping area which features high-end fashion labels.

History 
Double Bay developed soon after initial European settlement in 1788. In the early years of the colony, Double Bay was used as shelter for fishermen who would regularly fish around the harbour. Farming mostly cattle and lettuce a farm had developed and by 1814 it had increased to envelop the valleys leading into Woollahra, Bondi Junction, Bellevue Hill, and Point Piper.

Charles A. Messenger became the sculling champion of Victoria on 1 July 1878, Rowing Champion of New Zealand in 1881, and a contender for the sculling championship of the world in 1887. Charles Amos also established the first boatshed on Sydney Harbour at Balmain, from where it was later transferred by flotation to Double Bay. The early life of Double Bay revolved around the Messenger boatshed.

Charles Amos was the father of rugby league and rugby union player Dally Messenger, and Wally Messenger, who also played Rugby League for Australia. From their boatshed the Messenger brothers would row people across Sydney Harbour, including William Bede Dalley, the acting premier of New South Wales in 1885, who owned a castle in Manly.

Heritage listings 
Double Bay has a number of heritage-listed sites, including:
 Cross Street: Double Bay Compressed Air Ejector Station
 11 Gladswood Gardens: Gladswood House
 337–347 New South Head Road: Overthorpe (Double Bay)
 560 New South Head Road: Fairwater (Double Bay)
 4 and 6 Wiston Gardens, Double Bay: Houses

Population
According to the 2016 census, there were 4,642 residents in Double Bay. 55.9% of people were born in Australia. The most common countries of birth were England 5.8%, New Zealand 3.6% and South Africa 3.3%. 74.6% of people only spoke English at home. The most common ancestries in Double Bay were English 24.1%, Australian 15.8%, Irish 8.7%, Scottish 7.3% and Chinese 4.0%. The most common responses for religion were No Religion 29.5%, Catholic 20.3% and Anglican 14.7%. 

At the 2021 census, the population of Double Bay was 4,709.

Commercial area
The commercial area runs along New South Head Road and extends along surrounding streets of Knox Street, Cross Street and Bay Street. It features hotels and shopping, restaurants, supermarkets, offices and coffee shops.

Transport
Double Bay features a ferry wharf for Double Bay ferry services with regular services to Circular Quay and Darling Point. Bus services operate via New South Head Road to Bondi Junction, Watsons Bay and the City. The closest train station is Edgecliff Station on New South Head Road.

Sport and recreation
Double Bay's former residents include Dally Messenger, one of the most famous Rugby league players of all time who was born, raised, and lived most of his life in Double Bay. He attended Double Bay primary school and became a local celebrity in the first half of the 20th century. Another former resident is [Lisa-Jean Brough] who shares the joy of sailing and racing 18' foot skiffs. Starting here at the 18' Foot Sailing Club launched L-J into a career of sailing Sydney to Hobart Yacht Races. Her oldest daughter attended Double Bay Public school.

Gallery

Notable residents
 John Christian Watson (1867–1941), first Australian Labor Prime Minister and third Prime Minister of Australia
 Clements Frederick Vivian Jackson (1873-1955), an Australian mining engineer
 Emma Linda Palmer Littlejohn (1883–1949), feminist, journalist and radio commentator
 Sandy Pearce (1883–1930), rugby league footballer and boxer, after whom Pearce Street is named.
 Charlene Todman (1931–2018), early Australian disability sportsperson
 Mary Fairfax (1922–2017), at her estate "Fairwater" philanthropist and businesswomen

References

External links 
Double Bay – Sydney.com

 
Suburbs of Sydney
Bays of New South Wales
New South Head Road, Sydney